Yi Jong-mu (1360–1425) was a Korean general who led the Oei Invasion of Tsushima Island in 1419.

He was noted for leading a fleet of 227 ships and 17,285 soldiers which landed at the Tsushima Island in Aso Bay on June 19, 1419, which was met with little resistance. General Sō Sadamori, the Daimyo of Tsushima, proposed a treaty to the Joseon court in September, 1419.

His conquest not only rescued victims taken by Japanese pirates including 146 Chinese and 8 Koreans, but also put an end to Japanese pirate raids in Korea and China, as well as paving the way for special trade relationships in between Joseon Korea and the Sō clan of Tsushima Island.

See also
History of Korea
Military history of Korea
Military history of Japan
Joseon Dynasty

References and external links 
  General Yi's biography

Specific

1360 births
1425 deaths
15th-century Korean people
Korean generals